Carrie Genzel (born 18 September 1971) is a Canadian actress and film producer.

Career
Genzel had several recurring roles in soap operas during the 1990s, including The Bold and the Beautiful, Days Of Our Lives, and as Skye Chandler on All My Children from 1996 to 1997. She appeared television series such as Picket Fences, Beverly Hills 90210, The Outer Limits, Stargate SG-1, Smallville, Married... with Children, Wizards of Waverly Place, Under One Roof and Supernatural. Her film roles include The Imaginarium of Dr. Parnassus, Dead Rising: Watchtower, They're Watching, and Watchmen.

In 2012, Genzel won the Best Actress award at the Los Angeles International Underground Film Festival for the role of Emma in The Ballerina and the Rocking Horse.

Filmography

Film

Television

References

External links

Carrie Genzel Official Website

1971 births
Living people
Actresses from Vancouver
Film producers from British Columbia
Canadian film actresses
Canadian women film producers